Pseudomonas corrugata is a Gram-negative, plant-pathogenic bacterium that causes pith necrosis in tomatoes. Based on 16S rRNA analysis, P. corrugata has been placed in the P. fluorescens group. For a more comprehensive phylogenetic analysis of P. corrugata and its closely related phytopathogenic bacterium P. mediterranea, refer to Trantas et al. 2015.

References

External links
 Type strain of Pseudomonas corrugata at BacDive -  the Bacterial Diversity Metadatabase

Pseudomonadales
Bacterial plant pathogens and diseases
Tomato diseases
Bacteria described in 1978